Mathias Gidsel (born 8 February 1999) is a Danish handball player for Füchse Berlin and the Danish national team.

He represented Denmark at the 2021 World Men's Handball Championship. He also participated at the 2020 Olympics, and the 2022 European Men's Handball Championship.

Honours
 Danish Handball League:
 Winner: 2022

Individual awards
All-Star Right back of the World Championship: 2021
All-Star Right back of the European Championship: 2022
Most Valuable Player (MVP) of the Olympic Games: 2020
Most Valuable Player (MVP) of the World Championship: 2023
Top Scorer at the World Championship: 2023 (60 goals)
Handball-Planet - Best young player in the world: 2021
Danish Player of the year: 2021
Danish National team Player of the year: 2022

References

External links

1999 births
Living people
Danish male handball players
Handball players at the 2020 Summer Olympics
Medalists at the 2020 Summer Olympics
Olympic silver medalists for Denmark
Olympic medalists in handball
Handball-Bundesliga players
Expatriate handball players
Danish expatriate sportspeople in Germany
Füchse Berlin Reinickendorf HBC players